Richard Fitzgerald (1831–1884) was an Irish recipient of the Victoria Cross.

Richard Fitzgerald may also refer to:

Richard B. Fitzgerald (c. 1843–1918), American businessman
Richard Fitzgerald (died 1776) (1733–1776), Irish Member of Parliament
Richard FitzGerald, 3rd Earl of Kildare
Richard Albert Fitzgerald (1806–1847), Irish Repeal Association politician
Richard Joseph Fitzgerald (1881–1956), bishop of Gibraltar
Richard Fitzgerald (Minnesota politician) (1829–1892), American businessman, farmer, and politician
Rich Fitzgerald (born 1959), Pittsburgh politician and Allegheny County Executive
Richie Fitzgerald, Irish surfer
Dick Fitzgerald (Gaelic footballer) (1882–1930), Irish Gaelic football player
Dick Fitzgerald (Australian footballer) (1889–1957), Australian rules footballer
Dick Fitzgerald (basketball) (1920–1968), American basketball player